The Ostrobothnians (occasionally translated to English as The Bothnians), Op. 45, is a  opera in three acts written from 1917 to 1924 by the Finnish composer Leevi Madetoja. The story, variously comedic and tragic, takes place around 1850 in the historical Finnish province of Ostrobothnia and features as its central conflict the deteriorating relationship between the farm community and its oppressive sheriff.

On 25 October 1924, the Helsinki Philharmonic Orchestra premiered the opera at the Finnish National Opera under the baton of Tauno Hannikainen. The enthusiasm of critics and the public quickly elevated the work to the (informal) status of the country's "national opera". Working in its favor was Madetoja's use of well-known folk melodies and the libretto's focus on freedom from oppression and self-determination, the allegorical qualities of which were particularly salient to a country that had won recently its independence from Russia. This inaugural production ran until November 1940, for a total of 90 performances, making it the greatest success of Madetoja's career. Today, the opera is recognized as Finland's first significant contribution to the operatic repertoire and has been revived numerous times.

The work is also well known in its abridged form, a five-movement suite for orchestra that Madetoja excerpted from Acts 1 and 2 of the (then-unfinished) stage production's score and which Robert Kajanus premiered to acclaim in Bergen, Norway on 8 March 1923. The most famous number is  Song of the Prisoner, for which Madetoja set the popular Ostrobothnian folk song The Wind Bent the Birch; in addition to being the prelude to Act 1 of the opera, the melody also serves as its key leitmotif.

History 

The commission was first offered to Toivo Kuula in November 1917. Although Kuula viewed the play as a strong candidate for a libretto, its realism conflicted with his personal preference for fairy tale or legend-based subject matter, in keeping with the Wagnerian operatic tradition. When Kuula refused the opportunity, the commission fell to Madetoja, who had also expressed interest in the project. The composition process, begun in late December 1917, took Madetoja much longer than expected; letters to his mother indicate that he had entertained hopes of completing the opera by the end of 1920 and, when this deadline passed, 1921 and, eventually, 1922. In the end, the opera was not completed until September 1923, although it would be another full year until the opera premiered. Nevertheless, some of the music (from Acts 1 and 2) did see the light of day sooner, as Madetoja had pieced together a five-number orchestral suite at the behest of Kajanus, who premiered the suite on 8 March 1923 in Bergen, Norway during his orchestra tour; the reviews were positive, describing the music as "interesting and strange".

The first performance of the complete opera on 25 October 1924 at the Finnish National Opera (which, incidentally, was also the one-thousandth performance in the history of the Opera House).

It was, perhaps, the greatest triumph of Madetoja's entire career. Indeed, with The Ostrobothnians, Madetoja succeeded where his teacher, Jean Sibelius, famously had failed: in the creation of a Finnish national opera, a watershed moment for a country lacking an operatic tradition of its own. In Helsingin sanomat, Katila wrote on behalf of many Finns, calling The Ostrobothnians "the most substantial work in the whole of Finnish opera". The Ostrobothnians immediately became a fixture of the Finnish operatic repertoire (where it remains today), and was even produced abroad during Madetoja's lifetime, in Kiel, Germany in 1926; Stockholm in 1927; Gothenburg in 1930; and, Copenhagen in 1938.

The success of The Ostrobothnians was due to a confluence of factors: the appeal of the music, tonal but darkly colored; the use of folk melodies (blended with Madetoja's own idiom) familiar to the audience; a libretto (also by Madetoja) based upon a well-known and beloved play; a story about freedom from oppression and self-determination, the allegorical qualities of which were particularly salient in a country that had recently emerged from a war for independence; and, the skillful combination of comedic and tragic elements. The introduction to Act 1 (No. 2: Song of the Prisoner in the suite), for example, is based upon a famous Ostrobothnian folk song, The Wind Bent the Birch, which was one of the 262 folk songs Kuula had collected during his travels and which made its way into Madetoja's nationalistic opera, becoming its signature leitmotif.

Roles 
The Ostrobothnians comprises a cast of thirteen roles, of which ten are for male and three are for female voice types; the opera also includes mixed choir. The principal characters are Jussi (baritone), his sister Maija (soprano), her fiancee Antti (tenor), and Jussi's love Liisa (mezzo-soprano).

Synopsis

Act 1

Antti Hanka, a young freehold farmer, awaits trial for having stabbed a cobbler who insulted his fiancée, Maija Harri. Returning from the remand prison in Vaasa and transported to the Harri farm by Maija's father, Antti—shackled and dressed in prisoner's garb—sings the folk song Tuuli se taivutti koivun larvan (The Wind Bent the Birch). Maija, who is nervous to meet Antti and has gone into the woods, overhears her beloved's sorrowful song. Her brother Jussi, the young master of the Harri farm, retrieves her and arranges for the two lovers to meet alone. Maija struggles with her emotions: having recently converted to Pietism, she has renounced everything material but nonetheless still feels love for Antti and concern for his well-being. She begs him to repent his sins; he refuses, saying that it was incumbent upon him to defend her honor.

As an interlude, the focus shifts to two farmhands, Kaappo and Salttu, who have been drinking on the job and, thoroughly inebriated, are wallowing in self-pity. The arrival of the Sheriff interrupts the revelry. Although the Ostrobothnian farmers despise him for his brutal and oppressive tactics, they all nonetheless remove their hats out of deference to the law. The Sheriff demands to see Antti's travel paperwork, which Jussi comes forward to provide, but without removing his hat. Offended, the Sheriff strikes his whip, knocking Jussi's hat to the ground. Jussi, however, manages to grab the whip and defiantly breaks it in half. The sheriff departs, threatening reprisals for any future insolence.

Act 2

Liisa, a young servant girl at the Harri farm, pines for the brave Jussi; gradually she makes her feelings known to him. Jussi, with growing awareness of Liisa's beauty and innocence, begins to spend more time with her and soon their relationship deepens into love. Antti, who has been at court for sentencing, returns to the farm and announces that he has been convicted and ordered to prison. Maija, devastated, decides God's will cannot be for Antti to spend his life behind bars, and she persuades him to go on the lam. The village people have assembled on the Harri farm for dancing, but the arrival of a gang of ruffians interrupts the merrymaking. The men seek to plunder the farm, but withdraw when their leader, Köysti, loses in a wrestling match with Jussi. The victory is short-lived, when Jussi and the others discover that, during the fighting, Antti has disappeared. The act ends with the villagers searching for the escaped convict.

Act 3

Jussi and Liisa's love continues to blossom, and they begin to plan their wedding. Word of Antti's escape has reached the Sheriff, who returns to the Harri farm to interrogate the Ostrobothnians and sniff out the fugitive's confederates; accompanying the Sheriff is the Scribe, Lay Judge, and Bailiff. Kaappo is the first to be brought before the Sheriff; intimidated and confused, the farmhand provides false testimony that he last saw Antti drinking with Jussi. Kaisa, a motherly tenant of the Harri farm, provides far more resistance when she is questioned; her strategy of circumlocution enrages the Sheriff and he orders her out. After Kaisa departs, the Sheriff orders the Scribe to retrieve Jussi; he draws his whip from the side of his boot, itching for a fight.

The accused is brought before the Sheriff and after a brief sham trial, Jussi is handcuffed—his protestations of innocence notwithstanding—and taken into a backroom. The Lay Judge warns the Sheriff not to abuse his power and flout the law, but the Sheriff pushes past him and enters the room. Inside the Sheriff whips Jussi, seeking a confession. Their confrontation eventually spills into the main hall, where Jussi laments that he has been "beaten like a dog, like an old horse". He warns the Sheriff to stay away from him, but when he nonetheless advances, Jussi breaks his shackles and brandishes his knife. The Sheriff draws his revolver and fires two shots at Jussi, who nevertheless manages to stab the Sheriff to death. Although mortally wounded, Jussi's death is not immediate. Erkki, Maija (who confesses to being Antti's actual abettor), and Liisa each take a turn lamenting Jussi's fate. He drops to his knees and describes his vision: the oppressors are vanquished and the Ostrobothnians are slaves no longer. He asks Liisa to close his eyes, and her grief-stricken face is the last he ever sees.

Recordings
Full opera

Derivative works
Some of the music (from Acts 1 and 2) did see the light of day before the premiere of the completed opera, as Madetoja had pieced together a five-number orchestral suite at the behest of Robert Kajanus, who premiered the suite on 8 March 1923 in Bergen, Norway during his orchestra tour; the reviews were positive, describing the music as "interesting and strange". The two most famous numbers of the suite are No. 1 Open Plain (arranged from Act 2 of the opera, "Hoi Mansikki") and No. 2 Song of the Prisoner (arranged from the prelude to Act 1 of the opera). The numbers of the complete suite are as follows:

Notes, references, and sources
Notes

References

Sources

Operas by Leevi Madetoja
1924 operas
Finnish-language operas
Operas set in Finland
Operas set in the 19th century
Operas based on plays
Verismo operas
Suites by Leevi Madetoja
Operas
20th-century classical music